John Glenn Grimsley (February 25, 1962 – February 6, 2008) was an American linebacker in the National Football League (NFL) who played for seven seasons for the Houston Oilers.

Grimsley was born in Canton, Ohio, where he graduated from McKinley High School.  He played college football at Kentucky under coach Jerry Claiborne.

Grimsley was selected to the Pro Bowl after the 1988 season. In 1991, he was traded to the Miami Dolphins and stayed there until he retired in 1993.

He died of an accidental gunshot wound at his home in Missouri City, Texas on February 6, 2008.  After his death, he was found to have chronic traumatic encephalopathy as a result of his football career.

References

1962 births
2008 deaths
American football linebackers
American football players with chronic traumatic encephalopathy
Houston Oilers players
Miami Dolphins players
American Conference Pro Bowl players
Kentucky Wildcats football players
Players of American football from Canton, Ohio
Firearm accident victims in the United States
Accidental deaths in Texas
Deaths by firearm in Texas
Ed Block Courage Award recipients